Ball Glacier is a glacier  long with the head located between Mount Lister and Mount Hooker on the east side of the Royal Society Range. The glacier flows northeast between Craw Ridge and Tasman Ridge into Blue Glacier. It was named by the New Zealand Geographic Board after Gary Ball, a New Zealand mountaineer who climbed Mount Lister with an Italian field party, 1976–77, and camped on this glacier; he was field assistant with R.H. Findlay's New Zealand Antarctic Research Program party to this area, 1980–81.

See also
 List of glaciers in the Antarctic
 Glaciology
 Ball Peak

References 

Glaciers of Scott Coast